The National People's Power (NPP), or Jathika Jana Balawegaya (JJB), is a political alliance in Sri Lanka. It was established in 2015 by Anura Kumara Dissanayake, leader of the Janatha Vimukthi Peramuna.

It consists of 28 political parties and other organisations. It contests in elections under the compass logo. Anura Kumara Dissanayake is currently the leader of the electoral coalition and Nihal Abeysinghe is the general secretary. Since its inception, the NPP has been a prominent third party in Sri Lankan politics.

History
The NPP was formed by the members of the far-left Janatha Vimukthi Peramuna and 27 other parties, worker unions, women's rights groups and youth organizations including members of ethnic communities.

Opposition (2015–present)
After the 19th Amendment to the Constitution of Sri Lanka was passed, opposition parties represented in the parliament became nearly strong as the ruling party itself, which elects the president.

During the 2020 parliamentary elections, the NPP aimed to surpass the ruling Sri Lanka Podujana Peramuna and win the majority of seats in parliament. However, the SLPP achieved a landslide victory in the elections as the ruling party, while the Samagi Jana Balawegaya became the main opposition party. The NPP only secured 3 seats and was thus reduced to a third party. Anura Kumara later in a speech said that he was not satisfied with the SLPP's victory and the NPP's defeat. When the 20th Amendment to the Constitution of Sri Lanka was announced, the NPP launched a protest against it.

Ideology
The National People's Power is ideologically leftist and working-class centered. The NPP is led by the Janatha Vimukthi Peramuna. The predominant goal of the NPP is the nationalisation of Sri Lanka's resources.

Electoral history

Current parliamentary members

See also
Janatha Vimukthi Peramuna
Deshapremi Janatha Viyaparaya
Ceylon Communist Party (Maoist)

Notes

References

External links

 
2015 establishments in Sri Lanka
Political parties established in 2015
Socialist parties in Sri Lanka
Sri Lankan nationalism